Never Alone may refer to:

Albums
 Never Alone (Amy Grant album), 1980
 Never Alone (Seth & Nirva album), 2016
 Never Alone (Stitched Up Heart album), 2016
 Never Alone, by Jennylyn Mercado, 2014
 Never Alone, by the Wilburn Brothers, 1964

Songs
 "Never Alone" (2 Brothers on the 4th Floor song), 1993
 "Never Alone" (3JS song), English-language version of "Je vecht nooit alleen", representing the Netherlands at Eurovision 2011
 "Never Alone" (Anja Nissen song), 2016
 "Never Alone" (BarlowGirl song), 2004
 "Never Alone" (Jim Brickman song), 2006; re-recorded with Lady A, 2007
 "Never Alone" (Rosanne Cash song), 1985; covered by co-writer Vince Gill, 1989
 "Never Alone" (Tori Kelly song), 2018
 "Never Alone", by Dropkick Murphys from Boys on the Docks, 1997
 "Never Alone", by Felix Jaehn and Mesto, 2019
 "Never Alone", by Jocelyn, representing Nebraska in the American Song Contest, 2022
 "Never Alone", by Victoria Shaw, 2007

Other uses
 Never Alone (video game), a 2014 puzzle-platformer adventure game
 Never Alone, a mental health and suicide-prevention movement co-founded by Gabriella Wright